Mavea (also known as Mav̈ea or Mafea or Mavia) is an Oceanic language spoken on Mavea Island in Vanuatu, off the eastern coast of Espiritu Santo.  It belongs to the North–Central Vanuatu linkage of Southern Oceanic.  The total population of the island is approximately 172, with only 34 fluent speakers of the Mavea language reported in 2008.

There are 94 languages in the North Vanuatu linkage, including Mavea. The closest linguistic relative to Mavea, sharing a little over 70% of cognates, is Tutuba. Following Tutuba, Aore, South Malok, Araki, and Tangoa are the next closest relatives.

Language endangerment
Mavea is a moribund language and there are many factors as to why this is.

One factor would be the arrival and Christianization by the Seventh-day Adventist and Church of Christ missionaries in 1839. Only 16% of the population can speak Mavea. These native speakers of Mavea belong to Generation 1, 2, and 3 which ranges from the ages of 20–80 years old. Those born after 1980 ("Generation 4") are less fluent. Commonly, this generation is not taught the language, because the language is inactive and not used in any new domain.

Mavea is not used very commonly outside of the home; in particular, it is not used in school, which reduces the younger speakers' exposure to the language. Most speakers do not feel concerned with the possible loss of the Mavea language.

Bislama, the national lingua franca of Vanuatu, is used more frequently. This creole is the first language for many people in Vanuatu who live in the city. It is used for business, religious sacraments, politics, and is seen as a way to move upward in society.

Phonology
Mavea has 15 consonants and 8 vowels.

Plosives in Mavea are not aspirated.

Orthography
Linguolabial consonants are represented using the corresponding labial consonant with a diaeresis diacritic on top: p̈ ; v̈ ; m̈ .  The retroflex  is represented in the orthography as d.

Grammar

Pronouns
There are both free and bound pronouns. Free pronouns are common in many Pacific languages. These free pronouns do not change for gender, but shows numerical differences, including singular, plural, dual, or paucal.

For example:
 /mo/ = he/she/it (third person singular subject)
 He eats taro. = /mo-an pete/

Proper Nouns
Proper nouns includes personal names, vocatives, relational terms, and locatives. They do not proceed an article and can not be used with a determiner. To show gender distinction, males use the prefix /mol-/. For females, the prefix /vo-/ or /va-/ was added.

Common Nouns
Similar to the proper nouns, there are both bound and free common nouns. Both can be used in an argument, be quantified with a marker, be modified with a determiner, be the head of a relative clause, and be questioned with "who" or "what". Bound common nouns are separated into nouns of kinship, body parts, bodily functions, and whole part relations. Also shows possessives.

Verbs
Verbal predicates are marked with a subject agreement prefix. There are intransitive verbs, transitive verbs, ambitransitive, ditransitive, and auxiliary.

Intransitive verbs are used when the subject has no direct object receiving the action.

Adverbs
There are two kinds of adverbs: phrasal adverbs and sentential adverbs. Sententail adverbs take up the entire sentence and appear after or before the verb's core argument. For example: to show frequency, /te pong/ meaning "sometimes" is used as a sentential adverb.

Spatial adverbs are used to show the location of the speaker and the direction the speaker is speaking towards. For example:  means "here, at speaker's location." This is common in many Pacific languages.

Reduplication
Mavea shows partial reduplication in its grammar. Reduplication is used to show emphasis. For example: sua means "to paddle" and suosua means "to paddle intensely". Sometimes when using reduplication, the vowels can change. Usually the "a" changes to "o" or "e".

Adjectives
Adjectives can only be used as noun modifiers. There both adjectives as independent lexical items and also adjectives pulled from transitive verbs by using reduplication. For example:  is "paint" and "" means "painted house".

Prepositions
There are seven prepositions in Mavea.

Demonstratives

Pronouns
There are four attested demonstrative pronouns in Mavea: aro, nel(e), maro, and male. Aro and nel(e) can also function as demonstrative determiners, and aro specifically only rarely appears as a pronoun, as in:

Maro ('this one') is used to refer to something nearby the speaker, and has the plural form maror, which is formed by affixing the plural suffix -re:

Male ('that one') on the other hand is used when speaking of something that is distant to the speaker, both literally, as in

And metaphorically, in order to distance the speaker from the referent, as in

Malere is the plural form of male, and like maror is formed by affixing the plural -re:

Maro and male are both formed by combining the complementizer ma- and a locative adverbial; aro for the former, and ale for the latter.

Determiners
In addition to demonstrative pronouns, Mavea also has three demonstrative determiners: nele, (a)ro, and nor(o), although of these only nor(o) is not attested as a pronoun in addition to its role as a demonstrative determiner.

The three-way demonstrative system common to Oceanic Languages is not present in Mavean demonstrative determiners, occurring instead in the locative adverbs of the language. The demonstrative determiners of Mavea encode both spatial and temporal proximity to either the speaker, as in  

or to the discourse, as in

The plural forms neler(e), ror, and noror are formed by affixing what is likely a reduced form of the plural word re.

Nele, along with its plural form neler(e), is formed in part by the specific definite article le.

Nor(o), and its plural form noror, is actually made up in part by a cut down form of the third demonstrative determiner, (a)ro, while nele is not. Interestingly, the two demonstrative determiners which contain aro, that is nor(o) and (a)ro itself, are also the two demonstrative determiners which serve double duty as demonstrative pronouns, in addition to being used as locational adverbs, a function never assigned to nel(e)(re).

Additionally, one of the other demonstrative pronouns, maro, also has aro as one of its constituents.

Demonstrative determiners can refer to a location in both time and space, but the spatial location is often discourse-related, rather than speaker-related, as in the following example, where aro is used to refer anaphorically to a party (anana) that has previously been mentioned in the text:

This use is sometimes called the "tracking use". Ror, nor(o)(r), and nelere all also have anaphoric uses, as displayed in the following examples, where the noun phrase referents occurring prior to the demonstrative have each been mentioned previously:

The demonstrative determiners of Mavea follow the head noun when used adnominally, a pattern which is the norm in oceanic languages, though by no means universal. Examples of this include:

Spatial Deictics

Locative adverbs
Locative adverbs are a class of sentential adverb, modifying entire sentences, and as such occur either subsequent to the verb's core argument, as shown in:

Or more rarely prior to the verb's core argument, as shown in:

There are two sets of locative adverbs in Maṽea, all members of which serve as spatial deictics. There is the A-set, so named because all of its members begin with [a], and the K-set, so named because each of its members begins with [ko]. They form a six-way system based on proximity to the hearer, and to the speaker, as well as relative direction (up, down, or across)

Atisi(vo), atisa, and atiṽa, as well as their K-set equivalents konatisi(vo), konatisa, and konatiṽa, are likely derived from the form atu (or konatu for the K-set), compounded with a movement verb like si(vo) ('go down'), sa ('go up'), or ṽa ('go'):

Speakers can emphasise the distance in the forms atisi(vo), atisa, and atiṽa, as well as their K-set forms konatisi(vo), konatisa, and konatiṽa by producing them with a long [t], e.g.: [a.'t:i.si].

There is no easily discernible semantic difference between the A-set and the K-set, however some members of the A-set may also serve as demonstratives, as in:

which is not attested in any member of the K-set.
 
The spatial and temporal adverbs aro, aine, and kon(a)ro, as well as the demonstrative determiner nor(o), can be juxtaposed with a noun in order to form an adverbial predicate, as in

Morphology 
Personal pronouns in Mavea do not inflect for case or gender, but do show number (singular, dual, paucal, plural). First person non-singular has an inclusive/exclusive distinction. Independent personal pronouns are not obligatory, but are used for emphasis, contrast or focus.

Bound Pronouns
Bound pronouns are obligatory at the beginning of a predicate phrase. Only 1SG and 3SG inflect for mood.

Counting System 
The Mavea counting system is very similar to other Proto Oceanic languages, especially numbers 1 through 5, and 10.

 tea
 rua
 tol(u)
 vat(i)
 lima
 marava
 rave rua
 rattol(u)
 rappat(i)
 anavul(u)

Possession 
Mavea distinguishes direct and indirect possession. Direct possessive constructions nouns take a bound possessive clitic. On the other hand, indirect possession is expressed by the presence of a classifier to which a possessive clitic is suffixed.

Direct possession 
Direct possession is expressed by a possessive clitic attached to the noun when the possessor is not expressed as a Noun Phrase (NP). Alternatively, if no suffix exists for the person and number of the possessor, the nouns are followed by an independent pronoun.

The semantic classes of nouns participating in direct possessive constructions, include, body parts, and bodily functions, kinship terms, articles of clothing, and household goods.

A noun, which is directly possessed, takes a possessive clitic matching the possessor's features.

For example:

and

This third person singular possessive clitic, pronounced as [na], is suffixed to the noun 'Laloa' for 'saliva'.

Non-pronominal possessors
If a full NP expresses the possessor, the possessee takes the construct suffix –n, or can be pronounces [na], although this construct suffix is a homophony of the possessive clitic –n and –na the distribution is different as displayed in the following examples;

Note that the case of Full NP, the possessee precedes the possessor

and

Possession is recursive, in the following example, the noun 'vulu' which is possessed by the noun 'vanatu' which in turn is possessed by John, therefore both nouns a suffixed with –[n].

Indirect possession 
Nouns in indirect possession constructions do not take a possessive clitic, they require a classifier to which a possessive clitic (or construct suffix) is attached.

There are six classifiers in Mavea:

 a-       'to be eaten'
 ma-     'to be drunk'
 no-      'general possession, valuables'
 pula-   'anima raised, vegetable planted'
 sa-      'housing and land'
 madoue- 'a dead man's possession' 

classifier "a-" infers that the item is possessed is meant to be eaten

If the possessor is a full NP, the classifier is market with the construct -n

Summarised

Questions 
Intonation is used to distinguish yes-no questions because there is no syntactic way to do so. There are also tag questions which uses the negative tag /te modere/ at the end. In English, /te modere/ means "or not".

Some monoclausal content questions include:
 ape = where
  = when
 ise = who
 ivisa = how much/many
 matai = for what reason
 matan = why
 sa = what
 sava = which/what kind?
 se = which
 sur sa = about/for what

Negation 
Sentential negation is expressed with the bound prefix /sopo/ and appears right after the subject agreement prefix. The order is subject ---> negation ---> verb.

Sometimes /sopo/ can be shorten to /po/.

When the subject agreement marker is absent, the bare negation marker jumps to the front.

To show the aspectual meaning "not yet", /lo/ is added to the negation marker /sopo/. This refers to events that have not happened yet but are likely to in the future. Added to the end of this form of negation is /pa/ which means "still" or "yet".

 

When combined with /me/ the negation changes into "not anymore, no more".

Equative clauses are shown by adding the negative marker /sopo/ to the subject marker for third person singular /mo-/. Mosopo meaning " it is/was/not."

Negative locational predicates are similar to equative clauses, by adding the locational marker /na/ to the equative clause /mosopo/.

Notes
 References from 
 Guérin, Valérie (2008). Discovering Mavea: Grammar, texts, and lexicon. Doctor of Philosophy in Linguistics, University of Hawai'i.

 

 Other sources

External links
 Presentation of Mavea by Valérie Guérin.
 Mavea resources  at the Endangered Languages Archive (ELAR)
 Mavea-English-Bislama Dictionary

Espiritu Santo languages
Languages of Vanuatu
Definitely endangered languages